Parchment Valley is an unincorporated community in Jackson County, West Virginia, United States. Parchment Valley once had a post office, which is now closed.

Parchment Valley most likely takes its name from nearby Parchment Creek.

References

Unincorporated communities in Jackson County, West Virginia
Unincorporated communities in West Virginia